The North African Cup Winners Cup was a competition organised by the Federation of North African Football, that contains the winners of the domestic cups around North Africa. The competition contains representatives from Algeria, Tunisia, Morocco, Libya and Egypt.

History
The competition was founded along with the North African Cup of Champions in order to create a sense of competitiveness in the region. Tunisian club Esperance Sportive de Tunis claimed the inaugural title, defeating Algerian club JSM Béjaïa 2-1 over two legs.

On 2011 The competition was cancelled because the Arab Spring revolutions. On 2015, the Union of North African Football decided to merge the competition with the North African Cup of Champions and created the UNAF Club Cup.

Prize money
 Champions: $100,000 
 Runner-up: $50,000 
 3rd Place: $15,000 
 4th Place: $15,000

Finals

Winners by team

Winners by country

All-time tables

2 points for win

Clubs

Countries

See also 
 UNAF Club Cup
 North African Cup of Champions
 North African Super Cup
 North African Cup - a similar North African competition in French colonial era.
 Maghreb Cup Winners Cup - a similar North African competition in 1969 to 1975.

External links
 Cup Winners Cup on RSSSF.com
 Cup Winners Cup on Goalzz.com

 
UNAF clubs competitions
International club association football competitions in Africa
Defunct international club association football competitions in Africa